Apulon (Apoulon, Apula) was a Dacian fortress city close to modern Alba Iulia, Romania. The Latin name of Apulum is derived. The exact location is believed by many archaeologists to be the Dacian fortifications on top of Piatra Craivii, Craiva, Cricău, about 20 km north of Alba-Iulia.

Apulon was an important Dacian political, economic and social center, the capital of the Apuli tribe. It was first mentioned by the Ancient Greek geographer Ptolemy in his Geographia, under the name Apulon. It is also depicted in the Tabula Peutingeriana as an important city named Apula, at the cross road of two main routes: one coming from Blandiana, the other from Acidava. The two roads merge at Apula, with the next stop on the route being Brucla.

After the southern part of Dacia became a province of the Roman Empire, the capital of the Dacia Apulensis district was established here, and the city was known as Apulum. Apulum was one of the largest centers in Roman Dacia and the seat of the XIII Gemina Legion. The castra at Apulum is the largest in Romania, occupying 37,5 ha (750 x 500 m2).

Gallery

See also 
Dacia
Roman Dacia
List of ancient cities in Thrace and Dacia

Notes

External links 

 BUCKLE TYPES AND BELT FRAGMENTS FROM THE DACIANSETTLEMENT OF CRAIVA - „PIATRA CRAIVII” (ALBA COUNTY)

Dacian towns
Roman Dacia
Archaeological sites in Romania
Ruins in Romania
Former populated places in Romania
Dacian fortresses in Alba County
Historic monuments in Alba County
Dacian fortresses
Ancient history of Transylvania